Kenya Commercial Bank Plaza (KCB Plaza) is a building in Nairobi, the capital and largest city of Kenya. Construction began in December 2010 and the building was completed in 2015.

Location
The coordinates of the building are: 1° 18' 0.00"S, 36° 48' 48.00"E (Latitude:-1.300000; Longitude:36.813333).

Overview
Construction began in December 2010, and was originally expected to last two years. However, multiple delays put the building's construction behind of schedule until its completion in July 2015, approximately 30 months behind schedule.

Construction costs
The building is owned by the Kenya Commercial Bank Employee Pension Fund, who are footing the US$26 million (KES:2.1 billion) construction bill. KCB Plaza was expected to be one of the tallest skyscrapers in Nairobi at the time of its completion.

The main contractor was China Wu Yi Company Limited. ARUP was the environmental design engineers. Kenya Commercial Bank Group is the main tenant. The building is fitted with solar panels to supplement the power from the national grid. It also has the ability to harvest and treat rain water for use in the building. It is also fitted with water recycling capability, thereby reducing the cost of running the skyscraper.

See also
 Kenya Commercial Bank Group
 List of banks in Kenya
 List of tallest buildings in Nairobi

Photos and diagrams
 Artist's Impression of KCB Plaza At Nation.co.ke
Photo at Nairobiwire.com

References

External links
 Bank Staff Fund To Put Up KES:2.1 Billion Office Block
 Digital Banking encourages lender to leave the Nairobi CBD As at 18 May 2017.

Buildings and structures in Nairobi
Nairobi
Skyscraper office buildings in Kenya
Office buildings completed in 2015
2015 establishments in Kenya
KCB Group